Dunkel is an unincorporated community in Assumption Township, Christian County, Illinois, United States.

Dunkel was laid out in 1876. Dunkel's post office was established May 4, 1877 and disestablished August 31, 1902; the community is now served by the Pana post office. It was situated along the Illinois Central Railroad.  It was named for Elias Dunkel, a railroad employee. All that remains of Dunkel today are a few houses and a grain elevator operated by nearby Assumption Co-Op.

References

Populated places established in 1877
Unincorporated communities in Christian County, Illinois
Unincorporated communities in Illinois
1877 establishments in Illinois